Susanna Sophie Nel (born 27 August 1956) is a South African international lawn bowler.

Bowls career
In 2009 she won the fours silver medal at the Atlantic Bowls Championships and in 2011 she won the fours silver medal and triples bronze at the Atlantic Bowls Championships.

She competed in the women's fours and the women's triples events at the 2014 Commonwealth Games where she won a gold and bronze medal respectively. She was the 2014 pairs runner-up at the National Championships, bowling for the Rustenberg Impala Bowls Club.

Nel picked up two bronze medals at the Atlantic Bowls Championships held at Cyprus (30 November – 13 December 2015), in the triples (along with Anneke Snyman and Sylvia Burns) and the fours.

In 2016, she won a bronze medal with Elma Davis and Sylvia Burns in the triples at the 2016 World Outdoor Bowls Championship in Christchurch.

She was selected as part of the South Africa team for the 2018 Commonwealth Games on the Gold Coast in Queensland.

References

External links

1956 births
Living people
People from Zvishavane
Sportspeople from Midlands Province
Bowls players at the 2006 Commonwealth Games
Bowls players at the 2010 Commonwealth Games
Bowls players at the 2014 Commonwealth Games
Commonwealth Games gold medallists for South Africa
Commonwealth Games bronze medallists for South Africa
South African female bowls players
Commonwealth Games medallists in lawn bowls
Medallists at the 2010 Commonwealth Games
Medallists at the 2014 Commonwealth Games